Five Hundred Miles is a 2023 Chinese fantasy comedy film directed by Su Lun. It was released on 22 January 2023 (Chinese New Year).

Plot

Eighteen-year-old Lu Xiaogu switches places with lawyer Zhong Da, the boyfriend of 30-year-old Jin Hao, who Lu Xiaogu is secretly in love with.

Cast
Lei Jiayin as Zhong Da
Zhang Xiaofei as Jin Hao
 as Lu Xiaogu

Release

The film was released on 22 January 2023 (Chinese New Year). By 21:20 on the day of its release, it had grossed 150 million RMB.

References

External links
 

2023 films
2023 comedy films
2023 fantasy films
Chinese comedy films
Chinese fantasy films
Fantasy comedy films